Tholireyi Gadichindi is a 1977 Telugu-language film which stars Murali Mohan, Rajinikanth and Jayachitra. It was directed by K. S. Rami Reddy.

Plot

Cast 
 Murali Mohan
 Rajinikanth
 Jayachitra
 Kaikala Satyanarayana
 Mohan Babu
 Allu Rama Lingaiah
 Ramaprabha
 Jayamalini
 Sarathi

Soundtrack

References

External links 
 

1970s Telugu-language films
1977 drama films
1977 films
Films scored by Satyam (composer)
Indian drama films